is a top-down platforming shoot 'em up video game released for the Super Famicom on December 29, 1990. A crossover of the Ultra Series, Kamen Rider, and Gundam franchises, characters from these franchises are playable. The game is presented in a super deformed style. It is also part of the Compati Hero series. A North American release by Bandai was slated for June 1992, however it was never released.

Gameplay
SD the Great Battle is a shoot 'em up game with platforming elements at a top-down perspective. Players must shoot enemies while jumping over obstacles like pits. Three initial characters can be switched to during gameplay, Ultraman, Kamen Rider, and the RX-78-2 Gundam. Over the course of the game, three more characters will be available to be played as, Kamen Rider V3, Ultraman Taro, and the Knight Gundam. There are a total of seven levels to play through, and between them a cutscene will play, further advancing the story.

Notes

References

1990 video games
Banpresto games
Japan-exclusive video games
Platform games
Single-player video games
Shoot 'em ups
Super Nintendo Entertainment System games
Video games developed in Japan
Gundam video games
Kamen Rider video games
Ultra Series video games